(Songs after Rückert) is a collection of five Lieder for voice and orchestra or piano by Gustav Mahler, based on poems written by Friedrich Rückert. The songs were first published in Sieben Lieder aus letzter Zeit (Seven Songs of Latter Days).

The songs
 Blicke mir nicht in die Lieder! (Look not, love, on my work unended!) – 14 June 1901
 Ich atmet’ einen linden Duft (I breathed the breath of blossoms red) – July 1901
 Ich bin der Welt abhanden gekommen (O garish world, long since thou hast lost me) – 16 August 1901
 Um Mitternacht (At midnight hour) – Summer 1901
 Liebst du um Schönheit (Lovest thou but beauty) – August 1902

The first four songs were premiered on 29 January 1905 in Vienna, Mahler himself conducting, together with his Kindertotenlieder (also on poems by Rückert).  The last song, Liebst du um Schönheit, was not orchestrated by Mahler himself but by Max Puttmann, an employee of the first publisher, after Mahler's death.

The set of songs was not intended as a cycle: the Lieder were originally published independently from each other, connected only by the poetry and common themes. However, they were later published together and most often have been performed together and come to be known as the Rückert-Lieder, although Mahler did set more texts of Rückert. Artists such as Dietrich Fischer-Dieskau and Kathleen Ferrier have chosen their own order of the Lieder.

Publication
The songs were first published in 1910 by C.F. Kahnt of Leipzig as Sieben Lieder aus letzter Zeit (Seven Songs of Latter Days), together with "Revelge" and "Der Tamboursg’sell" (on poems from Des Knaben Wunderhorn) in the order:

 Ich atmet’ einen linden Duft
 Liebst du um Schönheit
 Blicke mir nicht in die Lieder
 Ich bin der Welt abhanden gekommen
 Um Mitternacht"
 Revelge (Reveille)
 Der Tamboursg’sell (The Drummer Boy)

Universal Edition has published a score consisting only of the five Rückert settings.

Instrumentation 
The size and constitution of the orchestra varies from song to song, but the instruments required for performance of the complete set are as follows: two flutes, two oboes, oboe d'amore, English horn, two clarinets, two bassoons, contrabassoon, four horns, two trumpets, three trombones, bass tuba, timpani, celesta, harp, piano and strings.

Discography
 Frederica von Stade and the London Philharmonic Orchestra, conducted by Andrew Davis, Columbia, 1979

References

External links
 
 Fünf Rückertlieder, the lyrics with translations at the LiederNet Archive
 Rückertlieder Chronologie Discographie Commentaires on gustavmahler.net (in French)

Song cycles by Gustav Mahler
Classical song cycles in German